Cat's meow may refer to:

 Meow (occasionally spelled miaow, miaou, etc.), an onomatopoeia for the voiced sound made by cats (Felis silvestris catus)
 "The cat's meow," an expression referring to something that is considered outstanding; coined by American cartoonist Thomas A. Dorgan (1877–1929)
 The Cat's Meow (1924 film), a 1924 lost silent short film starring Harry Langdon
 "The Cat's Meow", a 1966 episode of Batman TV series
 "The Cat's Meow", a 1986 episode of Mama's Family TV series
 The Cat's Meow (1930 film), a Krazy Kat animated film
 "The Cat's Meow", a 1987 painting by Willem de Kooning
 The Cat's Meow, a 2001 film

See also
 Meow (disambiguation)
 purr, a different cat sound
 Cat body language